List of public school districts in Orange County, California

Community College Districts:
 Coast Community College District
 North Orange County Community College District
 Rancho Santiago Community College District
 South Orange County Community College District

K-12
K-12 districts include:

Unified School Districts:
 Brea Olinda Unified School District
 Capistrano Unified School District
 Garden Grove Unified School District
 Irvine Unified School District
 Laguna Beach Unified School District
 Los Alamitos Unified School District
 Newport-Mesa Unified School District
 Orange Unified School District
 Placentia-Yorba Linda Unified School District
 Saddleback Valley Unified School District
 Santa Ana Unified School District
 Tustin Unified School District

Union High School Districts:
 Anaheim Union High School District
 Fullerton Joint Union High School District
 Huntington Beach Union High School District

Elementary School Districts:
 Anaheim Elementary School District
 Buena Park School District
 Centralia School District
 Cypress School District
 Fountain Valley School District
 Fullerton School District
 Huntington Beach City School District
 La Habra City School District
 Lowell Joint School District
 Magnolia School District
 Ocean View School District
 Savanna School District
 Westminster School District

See also

 List of elementary schools in Orange County, California

References

External links
Orange County Department of Education
Orange County Department of Education - Orange County Schools

 
Orange